Armando Calvo (25 December 1919 – 6 July 1996) was a Puerto Rican-born Spanish actor. His father was Juan Calvo Domenech, a Spanish actor and his mother was Minerva Lespier, a Puerto Rican. Calvo worked in Spain, Italy, and Mexico appearing in ninety films between 1939 and 1984.

Selected filmography

 El genio alegre (1939) - Antoñito
 Amore di ussaro (1940) - Carlos
 L'ispettore Vargas (1940)
 Tierra y cielo (1941) - Juan Ernesto Florín
 Goyescas (1942) - Luis Alfonso de Nuévalos
 Correo de Indias (1942) - Virrey del Perú
 The Scandal (1943) - Fabián Conde
 Life Begins at Midnight (1944) - Ricardo
 El hombre que las enamora (1944) - Eduardo
 Espronceda (1945) - José de Espronceda
 Last Stand in the Philippines (1945) - Teniente Martín Cerezo
 Everybody's Woman (1946) - Capitán Jorge Serralde
 The Private Affairs of Bel Ami (1947) - Jorge Duroy
 Encadenada (El yugo) (1947) - Enrique
 Ángel o demonio (1947) - Gabriel Araiza
 La mujer del otro (1948)
 La casa de la Troya (1948) - Gerardo Roquer
 La vorágine (1949)
 The Lady of the Veil (1949) - Esteban Navarro
 La venenosa (1949) - Luis de Sevilla
 Piña madura (1950) - Leonardo Pérez
 Médico de guardia (1950) - El Director de Hospital (Dr. Enrique Méndez)
 Mi marido (1951) - Gustavo Duarte y Luque
 Entre abogados te veas (1951) - El Abogangster
 Monte de piedad (1951) - Don Mario de Córdova
 Lodo y armiño (1951)
 Acapulco (1952) - Ricardo Serrano
 Mi adorado salvaje (1952)
 El ruiseñor del barrio (1952) - German Ricardi
 Doña Francisquita (1952) - Fernando
 Caribeña (1953)
 The Unfaithful (1953) - Rafael
 ¡Lo que no se puede perdonar! (1953) - Jorge del Río
 You Had To Be a Gypsy (1953) - Señor Calvo
 Romance de fieras (1954) - Ricardo Narváez
 La Calle de los amores (1954) - Arcadio Miranda
 Tu vida entre mis manos (1955) - Dr. Roberto Alonso
 El pueblo sin Dios (1955) - Padre Fernando
 Maternidad imposible (1955)
 La fuerza del deseo (1955) - Arturo
 El hombre que quiso ser pobre (1956) - Jorge Deval
 Ultraje al amor (1956) - Julio Soler
 Besos prohibidos (1956) - Dr. Daniel Solórzano
 Esposas infieles (1956)
 The Last Torch Song (1957) - Juan Contreras
 Call Me Bad (1957) - Dr. Luis Novoa
 Ama a tu prójimo (1958) - Doctor Ricardo Lugo
 La muralla (1958)
 La edad de la tentación (1959) - Ricardo Olivares, Padre
 Mi esposa me comprende (1959)
 Música de ayer (1959) - Carlos, Conde de San Telmo
 The Thieves (1959) - Joe Castagnato
 El amor que yo te di (1960) - Ricardo
 El hombre que perdió el tren (1960) - Maximino López
 Thaimí, la hija del pescador (1960) - Javier
 Orlak, el infierno de Frankenstein (1960) - Inspector Santos
 The Witch's Mirror (1962) - Eduardo Ramos
 Il segno di Zorro (1963) - Gen. Gutiérrez
 Bochorno (1963) - Don Luis
 A Coffin for the Sheriff (1965) - Lupe Rojo
 Ringo's Big Night (1966) - José the Mexican
 Los cuatro salvajes (1966) - Fidel
 Kriminal (1966) - Kandur
 Django Does Not Forgive (1966)
 Agente Sigma 3 - Missione Goldwather (1967) - Karamesinis
 Two Crosses at Danger Pass (1967) - Old Moran
 Mister X (1967) - George Lamarro
 Killer Adios (1968) - Bill Bragg
 Ringo the Lone Rider (1968) - Bill Anderson
 Go for Broke (1968) - José Gomez
 Satanik (1968) - Commissioner Gonzalez
 Pistol for a Hundred Coffins (1968) - (uncredited)
 El taxi de los conflictos (1969) - El marido engañado
 Cry Chicago (1969) - Senador
 Sartana's Here… Trade Your Pistol for a Coffin (1970) - Hoagy (uncredited)
 Il corsaro (1970)
 La otra residencia (1970)
 The Doubt (1972) - Prior de Zaratay
 El caserío (1972) - Santi
 Corazón solitario (1973) - Gerardo
 El amor empieza a medianoche (1974) - Paco
 Proceso a Jesús (1974) - Espectador
 Cabaret Woman (1974)
 Sábado, chica, motel ¡qué lío aquel! (1976) - Ricardo
 Marcada por los hombres (1977) - Ramón
 Fango (1977) - Andrés
 Guyana: Crime of the Century (1979) - Reporter
 El oreja rajada (1980) - Juez
 El canto de la cigarra (1980) - José
 Ni Chana, ni Juana (1984) - Armando

See also
List of Puerto Ricans

References

External links

1919 births
1996 deaths
Puerto Rican expatriates in Italy
People from San Juan, Puerto Rico
Puerto Rican male film actors
Puerto Rican expatriates in Spain
Puerto Rican expatriates in Mexico
Spanish male film actors
20th-century Puerto Rican male actors